Nor Aini Shariff is a Malaysian fashion designer and founder of the JARUMAS label.

References

External links
JARUMAS’s Official Webpage

Other links
CRAFT TRENDS IN ASEAN + 2016
http://ww1.utusan.com.my/utusan/info.asp?y=2006&dt=0508&pub=Utusan_Malaysia&sec=Keluarg{{a&pg=ke_01.htm

Living people
Malaysian people of Malay descent
Malaysian Muslims
People from Malacca
Malaysian fashion designers
Malaysian women fashion designers
Year of birth missing (living people)